Yahya Sakher Habash (10 November 1939 – 1 November 2009), also known as Abu Nizar, was one of the Fatah founding leaders.

Early years and education
Habash was born in Bayt Dajan, near Jaffa, on 10 November 1939. He became a refugee in the 1948 Arab-Israeli War, ending up first in Ramallah, then in the Balata refugee camp near Nablus. He joined the Baathists in 1952. He studied geology and water resources at Ain Shams University in Cairo beginning in 1958 and later in the University of Arizona.

Political career
He became a Palestinian nationalist in the early 1960s and joined Fatah in 1962, being responsible for recruitment. He was appointed Fatah regional command in Lebanon in October 1972. He went to exile with Arafat during the 1970s. Habash served as the ambassador of Palestine in the Soviet Union between 1984 and 1985. He was a member of the Fatah Central Committee from August 1989 to August 2009. He was also a writer, a poet and an artist. Habash served as the movement's general deputy of intellectual affairs.

Death
He died of a stroke in the West Bank on 1 November 2009 and was survived by his wife and four children (three sons and a daughter).

Honors
Habash was posthumously awarded on October 5, 2013 with the Star of Jerusalem Medal, the highest medal bestowed by the Palestinian militant terrorists.

References

External links
 Sakher Habash's website
 Fatah's Intellectual office website
 President Abbas awards Sakher Habash with the Star of Jerusalem Medal

1939 births
2009 deaths
Fatah members
20th-century Palestinian poets
Palestinian Muslims
Ain Shams University alumni
20th-century poets
Palestinian refugees